Héctor Martínez Torres (born 1 January 1995) is a Spanish professional footballer who plays as a central defender for Real Murcia.

Club career
Born in Alcalá de Henares, Community of Madrid, Martínez joined Real Madrid's La Fábrica in 2005 from hometown club RSD Alcalá. He left for Rayo Vallecano four years later, but returned to Real to finish his development.

Martínez made his senior debut with the C team on 17 April 2014 at the age of 18, starting in a 4–1 Segunda División B home win against UB Conquense. In 2015, after they were dissolved, he was promoted to the reserves also in the third division.

On 1 September 2016, Martínez signed with fellow third-tier side CD Guijuelo on loan for the season. In July of the following year, he agreed to a contract with Granada CF and was assigned to the B team in the same league.

On 10 July 2018, Martínez signed a new two-year contract with the Andalusians. He became a free agent on 23 July 2020, having made no competitive appearances for the main squad.

Martínez moved abroad for the first time in his career on 14 September 2020, joining several compatriots at AEK Larnaca FC of the Cypriot First Division on a two-year deal. He played his first match in top-flight football six days later, coming on as a second-half substitute for Tom Hateley in a 2–1 away loss to AC Omonia.

References

External links
Real Madrid official profile

1995 births
Living people
People from Alcalá de Henares
Spanish footballers
Footballers from the Community of Madrid
Association football defenders
Real Madrid C footballers
Real Madrid Castilla footballers
CD Guijuelo footballers
Club Recreativo Granada players
AEK Larnaca FC players
Mezőkövesdi SE footballers
Real Murcia players
Segunda División B players
Cypriot First Division players
Tercera División players
Nemzeti Bajnokság I players
Segunda Federación players
Spanish expatriate footballers
Expatriate footballers in Cyprus
Expatriate footballers in Hungary
Spanish expatriate sportspeople in Cyprus
Spanish expatriate sportspeople in Hungary